Lunch Ladies is a 2017 American comedy horror short film which was created and written by Clarissa Jacobson; produced by Rebel Minx, J.M. Logan, Joe Bratcher, Matt Falletta, and Jessica Janos; and directed by J.M. Logan. It won Film Threat! Best Short, and was screened at Clermont-Ferrand Film Festival in Opening Program and the Tous à Table Section.

Plot
Two sisters, Serretta and LouAnne Burr, are lunch ladies working in a high school called Melvin High. Both are unsatisfied with their job and cook terrible food. Both sisters are fans of the actor Johnny Depp and are hired by him to be his personal chefs after winning a cooking contest. The principal threatens to fire both women if they do not get better at cooking, much to the aggravation of Serretta. Serretta's Johnny Depp t-shirt gets ruined by potatoes after she kicks a container. Furious, Serretta goes to the lady's room to clean off her shirt. After a cheerleader named Alexsis insults Seretta, Serretta suffocates her to death with a plunger. Fearing jail, Seretta and LouAnne decide to bake the flesh of the corpse into meat pies, taking inspiration from the Tim Burton film Sweeney Todd: The Demon Barber of Fleet Street. They then give the meat pies to the students and staff who eat them, unknowingly committing cannibalism. The film ends with selfies and videos of Serretta and LouAnne in Hollywood, California.

Cast 

 Donna Pieroni (Seretta Burr)
 Mary Manofsky (LouAnne Burr)
 Daisy Kershaw (Alexis the Cheerleader)
 Chris Fickley (Principal Grossfetig)

Awards and nominations 

The film was screened at the following festivals:

 Bucheon International Fantastic Film Festival
 Clermont-Ferrand International Short Film Festival
 Flickerfest
Imagine Film Festival
 Palm Springs International Film Festival
 Santa Barbara International Film Festival

It received the following awards and nominations:

Rhode Island International Film Festival - won Best Editing
Strasbourg European Fantastic Film Festival - nominated, Octupus d’Or
Nightmares Film Festival - won Best Horror Comedy Short

References

External links 

 
 

Short film awards
American psychological horror films
American horror drama films
American splatter films
American horror short films
Films about food and drink
American drama films
Sweeney Todd
Films set in Los Angeles
High school films
Films about chefs
American comedy horror films
Films about cannibalism
2010s English-language films